Kazipet is the major educational and transport hub in Hanumakonda district in the Indian state of Telangana. It is a city in Warangal Tri-City, and a mandal in Hanamakonda district. Kazipet falls under Greater Warangal Municipal Corporation.

Earlier Kazipet was a separate city in Warangal. The three urban cities Kazipet, Hanamkonda and Warangal are together known as Warangal Tri-City. The cities are connected by National Highway 163. The major stations are Kazipet Junction railway station and Warangal railway station.

Neighborhoods
Neighborhoods in Kazipet include: 
Somidi 
Ammavaripet
Madikonda 
Shayampet
Tharalapalli 
Rampur
Kadipikonda
Kothapalli
Bapuji Nagar

Railway junction

Kazipet railway station is an important station that connects North and South India, and hosts a locomotive (largely diesel) maintenance division.

Geography 
Local streets include Bapuji Nagar, Bhavani Nagar, Balaji Nagar, Diesel Colony, Prasanth Nagar, Rahmath Nagar, Siddhartha Nagar, Somidi, Venkatadri Nagar, Vidhyanagar Vishunupuri and Jublee Market.

Culture
Syed Shah Afzal Biabani (1795 – 1856 A.D / 1210 – 26 Safar, 1272 AH) was a Sufi from Warangal, Hyderabad State (now Kazipet 132 km from Hyderabad, India). He was appointed Kazi of Warangal during the reign of Nizam Ali Khan (Asaf Jah II). Thus the name Kazipet. His dargah is among Warangal's pilgrimage centers.

The word "Biabani" indicates a type of rural area in Persian and Urdu. He received this nickname because he spent 12 years in Tasawwuf (a form of Sufi meditation) in the caves located in the forest of Battupalli near Kazipet.

References

External links
 More about WAGON Manufacture Unit
 Warangal District website. Come & Explore the Glorious Historic City
 Warangal Attractions
 Ganapesvara temple in Ghanpur

Neighbourhoods in Warangal
Cities and towns in Hanamkonda district
Mandals in Hanamkonda district